Andrew James Tierney  (born 20 June 1974) is an Australian singer-songwriter and musician, who is a member of the music group Human Nature.

He is the brother of fellow band member Michael Tierney, and he and his wife live in Las Vegas.

References

1974 births
Living people
Australian people of Irish descent
Australian singer-songwriters
Human Nature (band) members
Singers from Sydney
21st-century Australian singers
Recipients of the Medal of the Order of Australia
21st-century Australian male singers
Australian male singer-songwriters